The Interministerial Committees, in Spain, are a collective work body and sometimes decision-making-body consisting of senior officials of the State Administration belonging to different departments. To be considered an interministerial committee it is needed to be composed by at least three members and be able to make decisions, make proposals, advise or control a specific matter.

Unlike the Government Delegated Committees, to this committees may attend officials from other administrations or representatives of social interest organizations.

Common notes

Powers 
The powers of the interministerial committees vary among themselves since their specific functions are established in their constitutive instrument. However, they need to have one of this competences:

 Decision-making powers.
 The power for proposing or issuance of compulsory reports that should serve as a basis for decisions of other administrative bodies.
 Powers to monitor or control the actions of other bodies of the General State Administration.

Requirements 
The constitutive instrument of this committees is not always the same:

 If the chair of the committee has the rank of director-general or more, a royal decree it is needed.
 If the chair of the committee has a lower rank of that of director-general, a joint ministerial order it is needed (this means, an order issued by the ministers of the departments involved).

Current committees 
These are some of the committees that are currently active:

References 

Government of Spain